Magique is the French word for magic and may refer to:

 Magique: is a fictional character in the Marvel Universe.
 Magique (mascot): the Olympic mascot of the 1992 Winter Olympics in Albertville 
 Judikael Magique Goualy: is an Ivorian footballer

See also 
 Magic